Dharamsar (Urdu: دھرم سر) is an alpine lake in the Kaghan Valley in the Khyber-Pakhtunkhwa province of Pakistan. It is located approximately 4,100 meters (13,450 feet) above sea level to the left of Babusar Top going eastwards from Chilas on the Karakoram Highway, next to the larger Sambaksar ("sar" means "lake" locally) and Ganai Gali. Dharamsar lake is located close to the border of Khyber Pakhtunkhwa and Azad Jammu and Kashmir just south of the meeting point of all three of Khyber Pakhtunkhwa, Azad Kashmir and Gilgit-Baltistan.

See also 
 Lulusar
 Dudipatsar

External links 
 Stunning Landscape Beauty Of Lake Dharmsar In Naran Valley Pakistan

References

Lakes of Khyber Pakhtunkhwa
Mansehra District